Theatrical blood, stage blood or fake blood is anything used as a substitute for blood in a theatrical or cinematic performance. For example, in the special effects industry, when a director needs to simulate an actor being shot or cut, a wide variety of chemicals and natural products can be used. The most common is red food coloring, often inside small balloons coupled with explosive devices called squibs.

Origins
Alfred Hitchcock used Bosco Chocolate Syrup as fake blood in his 1960 thriller Psycho. Since the film was in black and white, the color was less important than the consistency.

Reasons for use
There are many reasons for substituting for real blood in the film industry, such as ethical and sanitary concerns, and concerns for the emotional well being of the actors. Also, actual blood's tendency to coagulate and solidify quickly make it unsuitable for repeated takes without freshening; the longer-lasting viscosity of stage blood makes it far easier to work with on the set.

Typical recipe

Fake blood generally consists of the following in various ratios:
 Corn syrup (or plain syrup) as the base
 Dishwashing liquid to prevent the blood from beading and staining
 Opacifier, e.g. titanium dioxide to make blood non-translucent
 Red food colouring as the main colour
 Blue food colouring to darken the tone
 Water, dilute to desired consistency

Tomato ketchup, chocolate syrup and cherry/strawberry topping sauce (to darken, add solid 'chunks' to the texture and increase viscosity) are also common ingredients. Most recipes can cause staining, so the wardrobe should be washed as soon as possible.

Kensington Gore
"Kensington Gore" (a pun on the London place and street) was a trademark for fake blood used in films and in theatre. It was manufactured by a retired British pharmacist, John Tinegate or Tynegate, during the 1960s and 1970s, in the village of Abbotsbury, Dorset. Many varieties of blood, having various degrees of viscosity, shades and textures, were available.  Since Tinegate's death, the name "Kensington Gore" has become a generic term for stage blood. Kensington Gore was used in the film The Shining.

Other uses
Theatrical blood has other applications apart from its use in the film industry.

The crime scene investigation science of bloodstain pattern analysis uses stage blood or sometimes cow's blood in mock-up crime scenes when training new investigators.

The art of moulage uses theatrical blood in applying mock injuries for the purpose of training emergency response teams and other medical and military personnel.

Theatrical blood is also popularly used in Halloween costumes to portray injury, shot/stab wounds or special effects looks for the purpose of cosmetic entertainment. It is also used in certain horror-themed live action role-playing games.

See also
 Blood substitute
 Blood squirt
 Theatrical makeup

References

External links

Blood
Special effects
Prop design
Theatre